The 2012 European Pairs Speedway Championship was the ninth edition of the European Pairs Speedway Championship. The final was held in  Rivne, Ukraine on 22 September. The Ukraine won their first title.

Calendar

Rules
Semi-Final 1: 3 pairs will qualify to the Final
Semi-Final 2: 3 pairs will qualify to the Final
The pair of Ukraine team will be allocated to the Final

Semifinal 1
  Munkebo
 August 25

Semifinal 2
  Miskolc
 September 8

Final
  Rivne
 September 22

See also 
 2012 Speedway European Championship

References 

2012
European Pairs
2012 in Ukrainian sport